Brother Dash (born Dasham K. Brookins; December 3, 1971 in Brooklyn, New York, United States) is an American Muslim spoken word artist, essayist and photographer.

Career
Brother Dash has performed and spoken at innumerable venues for both Muslim and non-Muslim audiences, including the Isna convention, the MSA National convention, EidFest!, Global Peace and Unity Event in London, MuslimFest in Toronto, and many universities, including Yale, Columbia, Rutgers, Cambridge and Drew. He has been featured on and performed for many media outlets, including the BBC Radio 4’s documentary "Sing Your Own Psalms", WBAI, WTOR, Islam Channel, and Al-Arabiya TV.

Brother Dash is the founder of the arts-based non-profit organization I Inspire, inc., which "provides comfort, inspiration and empowerment through the arts."

Discography

Solo
Spoken Soul (2009)
Poetically Speaking: Savory Spoken Word...Spiritually Served (2007)
The MuslimPoet EP (2005)

Collaborations
Rhyme and Reason, The Poets of Metaphorical Records (2003)

Guest appearances
The Adventures of Hakim 2 Khaleel Muhammad (2008)
Ilâhî Suhail Najmi (2008)

References

External links
Brother DASH
I Inspire, inc.

Living people
1971 births
Muslim poets
People from Brooklyn